Plottage is the increase in value realized by combining adjacent parcels of land into one larger parcel.  The process of combining the parcels is known as assemblage. Generally, the value of the whole parcel will be greater than the sum of the individual smaller parcels.

Sources

External sources
Estimating assemblage value to help buyers and sellers 

Real estate terminology